The 2022–23 Seattle Kraken season is the second season for the National Hockey League (NHL) franchise. They play their home games at Climate Pledge Arena.

In January 2023, the Kraken became the first team in NHL history to win all seven games of a road trip.

Standings

Divisional standings

Conference standings

Schedule and results

Preseason
The preseason schedule was announced on July 5, 2022.

Regular season
The regular season schedule was released on July 7, 2022,

Player statistics
As of March 1, 2023

Skaters

Goaltenders

†Denotes player spent time with another team before joining the Kraken. Stats reflect time with the Kraken only.
‡Denotes player was traded mid-season. Stats reflect time with the Kraken only.

Roster

Transactions
The Kraken have been involved in the following transactions during the 2022–23 season.

Key:

 Contract is entry-level.

 Contract initially takes effect in the 2023–24 NHL season.

Trades

Players acquired

Players lost

Signings

Draft picks

Below are the Seattle Kraken's selections at the 2022 NHL Entry Draft, which were held on July 7 to 8, 2022. It was held at the Bell Centre in Montreal, Quebec.

References

Seattle Kraken seasons
Seattle
Seattle Kraken
Seattle Kraken
Seattle Kraken